Kapau-a-Nuakea was a Chiefess of Molokaʻi. 

Kapau-a-Nuʻakea was the only known child of Chief Keʻoloʻewa and Chiefess Nuʻakea.

Kapau-a-Nuakea and her husband Lanileo’s daughter, Kamauliwahine, succeeded Kapau-a-Nuʻakea.

References

Hawaiian monarchs
Hawaiian chiefesses